Duane Martin (born August 11, 1965) is an American actor. He began his career while appearing on numerous of television sitcoms before portraying Robert James on the UPN/CW 39 sitcom All of Us (2003-2007) and also starring on the FOX 26 police-procedural series L.A.'s Finest as Detective Ben Baines. Martin also appeared in many films throughout his career including White Men Can't Jump (1992), Above the Rim (1994), The Inkwell (1994), The Faculty and Woo (both in 1998), Deliver Us from Eva (2003), Ride or Die (2003), and The Seat Filler (2004).

Early life and education 
Martin was born in Brooklyn, New York, and he graduated from New York University. He played NCAA Division III basketball at NYU and was signed as an undrafted free agent to a non-guaranteed contract in the National Basketball Association (NBA) with the New York Knicks in 1989. However, he was soon cut and never actually played in the NBA.

Career 
Martin first made his TV appearance in the NBC comedy series Out All Night, which also starred Patti LaBelle, Vivica A. Fox and Morris Chestnut. He appeared in the Boyz II Men music video "I'll Make Love to You". He was a cast member with Vivica A. Fox and Jon Cryer in the short-lived Fox sitcom Getting Personal. He portrayed TV reporter Robert James on the UPN/The CW sitcom All of Us. He guest starred on his then-wife's sitcom Rita Rocks (2009) as Chuck; and Fernando on The Paul Reiser Show (2011).

Notable feature film roles include Willie in White Men Can't Jump (1992), Jr. Philips in The Inkwell (1994), and Kyle Lee Watson in Above the Rim (1994). In the romantic comedy The Seat Filler (2004), Martin plays a lead role as law student who falls in love with a celebrity. He portrays himself in the BET comedy Real Husbands of Hollywood. In 2017, Martin portrayed Louil Silas, Jr. in the film The New Edition Story.

Personal life 
He was married to former Martin and My Wife and Kids star Tisha Campbell. The couple wed on August 17, 1996, and have two sons. In February 2018, Campbell filed for divorce and it was finalized in December 2020.

Filmography

Film

Television

Awards and nominations 
BET Comedy Awards
2004: Nominated, "Outstanding Supporting Actor in a Box Office Movie" – Deliver Us From Eva
2005: Nominated, "Outstanding Lead Actor in a Comedy Series" – All of Us

Daytime Emmy Award
1993: Nominated, "Outstanding Performer in a Children's Special" – CBS Schoolbreak Special

NAACP Image Award
2007: Nominated, "Outstanding Actor in a Comedy Series" – All of Us

References

External links 

Duane Martin cast bio on The CW
Duane Martin's biography on filmbug

1965 births
Living people
20th-century American male actors
21st-century American male actors
African-American basketball players
American male film actors
NYU Violets men's basketball players
Basketball players from New York City
Sportspeople from Brooklyn
African-American male actors
American male television actors
Male actors from New York City
American men's basketball players
20th-century African-American sportspeople
21st-century African-American people